Classified is the self-titled and third major release studio album by Canadian rapper Classified released on January 22, 2013, on Universal Music Canada. This is his fourteenth studio album overall. The album had debuted at #1 on the Canadian Albums Chart, earning Classified his first number one album in the country. The first official single; "Inner Ninja" reached #5 on the Canadian Hot 100, making it Classified's first top-ten hit on the chart; the song has earned a 2013 Juno Award for "Rap Recording of the Year" and has been certified 4× Platinum in digital downloads by Music Canada,
it Classified's second song to receive platinum status, the first being "Oh...Canada". The second official single off the album is "3 Foot Tall" which was also certified Platinum. The third single off the album is "Pay Day". Other promotional singles from the album include "Anything Goes" and "Familiar", both of which had accompanying music videos. As of March 2014, the album was certified Gold by Music Canada and was also re-released on March 11, 2014, adding the hit single "Higher" featuring B.o.B. In September 2017, the album was certified Platinum by Music Canada.

Track listing

Personnel

Source:

Chart positions

References

2013 albums
Classified (rapper) albums